The World Forestry Center is a nonprofit educational institution in Portland in the U.S. state of Oregon.  Located near the Oregon Zoo in Washington Park, the organization was established in 1964 as the Western Forestry Center, with the actual building opening in 1971.

History

The  World Forestry Center has its roots in the 1905 Lewis and Clark Centennial American Pacific Exposition and Oriental Fair for which an enormous log cabin was built of huge native trees and advertised as the world's largest.  Public interest in the Forestry Building, which was turned over to the State of Oregon, lasted long after the exposition ended, right up until it was destroyed by fire on August 17, 1964.

The day after the fire, a group of civic and industry leaders conceived The Western Forestry Center. A new, more fire-resistant forestry building designed by Oregon architect John Storrs was built in Washington Park. It opened to the public on June 5, 1971.  The name was changed to "World Forestry Center" in 1986 to reflect the center's revised focus on forestry on a global scale.

On June 30, 2005, after a $7 million, 6-month renovation, the  museum reopened with new interactive exhibits about the sustainability of forests and trees of the Pacific Northwest and the world.

Programs
The World Forestry Center's mission is to "educate and inform people about the world's forests and trees, and their importance to all life, in order to promote a balanced and sustainable future."

The center achieves its mission with three programs: the Discovery Museum, two donated working forests—the Magness Memorial Tree Farm and the Johnson-Swanson Tree Farm—and the World Forest Institute which was established in 1989. The primary program is the International Fellowship Program.

In 1989, the World Forestry Center established the World Forest Institute to meet a growing demand for forestry information.  As the forestry sector becomes increasingly complex, there is a greater need for international collaboration and exchange of information on forest trade, regulation, management, and forest resources. The World Forest Institute was created through the vision and support of Harry A. Merlo, a pioneer of the forest products industry, and an early visionary of the globalization of the forestry sector.

The fellowship program brings young forestry and forest products professionals from around the world to work at the World Forest Institute for 6 to 12 months.  Fellows are commonly sponsored by their employer, government institutions, the forest industry, or an NGO, and carry out applied research projects of interest to their sponsors.  In addition to completing a practical research project, the program works to get Fellows a broad exposure to natural resource management in the U.S. so that when they return to their home countries they have a basic understanding of the owners and managers of land and natural resources throughout the country.

The institute won the 2012 Portland Mayor's International Business Award from the Oregon Consular Corps. This award recognizes businesses that contribute to a global environment in Oregon.

The World Forestry Center campus also accommodates three other buildings: Julian N. Cheatham Hall, Harold A. Miller Hall and Harry A. Merlo Hall, which houses the administrative offices and the World Forest Institute.

The Leadership Hall of Fame
The Leadership Hall of Fame commemorates people who have made important contributions to forestry.  The photographs and biographies of nearly 200 forestry leaders are displayed in three chests constructed of select Black Walnut from the eastern U.S.

Public access
Parking at the World Forestry Center costs $2 per hour, to a maximum of $8 per day. The Washington Park light rail station provides regional public transit access to the World Forestry Center. Additionally, TriMet bus route 63-Washington Park provides daily service to the World Forestry Center via Washington Park.

See also 
 Montgomery Park (Portland, Oregon), a famous building sited next to the original Forestry Building.
 Vaughn Street Park, a baseball stadium that also neighbored the original Forestry Building.

References

External links 

World Forestry Center website
Multnomah County records website: 1964 photo of forestry building burning
Oregon Blue Book entry
World Forest Institute

1964 establishments in Oregon
Forestry education
Forestry museums in the United States
Forest research institutes
Museums in Portland, Oregon
Natural history museums in Oregon
Washington Park (Portland, Oregon)
World forestry